Leuconitocris murphyi is a species of beetle in the family Cerambycidae. It was described by Jérôme Sudre and Pierre Téocchi in 2005. It is known from Malawi.

References

Leuconitocris
Beetles described in 2005